Uwe Stock (born 5 December 1947) is a German judo athlete, who competed for the SC Dynamo Berlin / Sportvereinigung (SV) Dynamo. He won medals at national and international competitions. In 1973 he took over the GDR-Championtitel from Helmut Howiller.

Stock was born in Wustrow.

References 

German male judoka
Living people
1947 births
20th-century German people